Andrea Benetti may refer to:
 Andrea Benetti (canoeist)
 Andrea Benetti (artist)